Frasure is a surname. Notable people with the surname include:

Brian Frasure, American paralympic athlete
Evan Frasure (born 1951), American politician
Jesse Frasure (born 1981), American musician also known as DJ Telemitry
Robert C. Frasure (1942–1995), American diplomat